Couleurs et parfums is a 1999 album by Carole Fredericks, an American-born singer most noted for her work in France, featuring a cover of Cyndi Lauper's "Time After Time" entitled "KAAI DJALLEMA" sung in Wolof and English. The album combines Fredericks' early experiences in the United States with the cultural influences of France. Couleurs et parfums was transformed into French lessons in 2003 and the album was reissued with the addition of one song, Veille, in 2007.

Track listing

Qu’est-ce qui t’amène			3:52
J’ai le sang blues				3:52
Kaai Djallema/Time After Time		4:17
Respire						3:52
Le prix à payer				4:25
Mighty love					4:20
Au bout de mes rêves			3:26
Ecope						3:36
Personne ne saurait			3:44
Vain						4:16
Tu es là					4:12
Bonus Track: Veille						4:16

Personnel
Carole Fredericks – lead vocals, background vocals
Poetic Lover – vocal duet Personne ne saurait
Nicole Amovin – vocal duet ‘Kaai Djallema’
Jacques Veneruso – guitar, background vocals
Christophe Battaglia – claviers
Didier Mouret – Fender Rhodes, piano
Christophe Nègre – tenor sax
Bernard Allison – guitar solo Vain and  Veille (appears courtesy of RUF RECORDS)
Cyril Tarquigny – electric guitar
Emmanuel Nabajoth – guest vocalist
Théo Allen – background vocals
Jean-Jacques Goldman – background vocals
Yvonne Jones – vocal duet Au bout de mes rêves, background vocals
Maria Popkiewicz – background vocals
Jacques Veneruso, Christophe Battaglia – Production and arrangements
Letty M’Baye – adaptation of ‘Time After Time’ to Wolof

References

1999 albums